Gregory Hinde is an American composer.  He has written music for animated television series such as The Grim Adventures of Billy and Mandy, Evil Con Carne and worked on the final season of The Wild Thornberrys. Gregory studied traditional performance, composition and arrangement at the Birmingham School of Music in England (now UCE Birmingham Conservatoire), and the London School of Creative Studies.

References

External links
 Gregory Hinde website

American television composers
Living people
Year of birth missing (living people)